Alma Preinkert (October 22, 1895 – February 28, 1954) was the registrar at the University of Maryland before being murdered by an intruder at her Washington, D.C. home. A Maryland alumna and a beloved figure in the university community, her murder sent shockwaves through the area. Although a large investigation ensued, her attacker was never identified.

A building on the university's College Park campus, the Preinkert Field House (which currently contains the National Center for Smart Growth and the Environmental Finance Center), and Preinkert Drive are named after Alma Preinkert.

See also 
 List of unsolved murders

Selected publications
Preinkert, A. H., and American Association of Collegiate Registrars and Admissions Officers. (1940). The work of the registrar: A summary of principles and practices in American universities and colleges. Washington, DC: American Association of Collegiate Registrars and Admissions Officers.

References

Further reading
Cattell, J. M. K. (1932). Preinkert, Alma H(enrietta): University of Maryland, College Park. Leaders in Education, a Biographical Directory.
Rule, Leslie (2006) When the Ghost Screams: True Stories of Victims Who Haunt, Andrews McMeel Publishing (Accessed May 2012)
Preinkert, Alma Henrietta: Univ. official. (January 1, 1935). American Women: the Official Who's Who Among the Women of the Nation, 1935–1936.
Report of the Chronicler for 1954 Records of the Columbia Historical Society, Washington, D.C., Vol. 53/56, pp. 406–435

External links 
 Alma H. Preinkert publication at the University of Maryland libraries

1895 births
1954 murders in the United States
1954 deaths
American murder victims
Deaths by stabbing in the United States
Female murder victims
People murdered in Washington, D.C.
University of Maryland, College Park administrators
University of Maryland, College Park alumni
Unsolved murders in the United States
20th-century American academics